Destination Biafra is a 1982 novel by Nigerian writer Buchi Emecheta, first published in London by Allison & Busby. It is considered to be Emecheta's personal account of the Biafra War. Destination Biafra was republished in paperback on 1 March 1994 by Heinemann Educational Books as part of the African Writers Series.

References

Allison and Busby books
1982 Nigerian novels
Nigerian English-language novels
Novels set in Nigeria
Novels by Buchi Emecheta